Ian Gilfillan (born 7 June 1932) is a former Australian politician. He was educated in Adelaide and was based on Kangaroo Island. He contested the 1974 federal election as a member of the Australia Party, but joined the Australian Democrats in 1977. In 1982, he was elected to the South Australian Legislative Council as a Democrat, holding the position until 1993. He returned to the Council in 1997 and served until his retirement in 2006.

References

1932 births
Living people
Australian Democrats members of the Parliament of South Australia
Members of the South Australian Legislative Council
21st-century Australian politicians